A Daughter of the Poor is a 1917 American silent comedy-drama film produced by Fine Arts Film Company and released by Triangle Film Corporation. The film was directed by Edward Dillon and starred young Bessie Love.

Although incomplete, prints of the film survive at the George Eastman House.

Plot 
Although she and her family are poor, Rose (Love) is very generous to a lame child Lola (Giraci). Her kindness captures the attention of wealthy publisher Stevens (Stockdale), whose interest in Rose angers her beau Creig (Beranger), who is a worker and radical writer. When her uncle is imprisoned, Rose goes to the father of Stevens (Stewart) to have him released. He is impressed by Rose, and learns about Lola, deciding to adopt her. Creig follows Rose to the Stevens home, and is surprised to find that they published his radical treatise, and are prepared to pay him for his work.

Cast 

 Bessie Love as Rose Eastman
 Max Davidson as Joe Eastman
 George Beranger as Rudolph Creig
 Carl Stockdale as James Stevens
 Roy Stewart as Jack Stevens
 Mae Giraci (as Tina Rossi) as Lola
 Carmel Myers as Hazel Fleming

Production 
In production, the film was known as The Doll Shop and The Spitfire.

Reception 
Overall, the film received mixed reviews. One review deemed the production as "flawless" and declared Love's performance was "her best ... thus far." Variety noted issues with continuity. Another review said that the film was "not up to the Triangle standard."

References

External links 

 
 
 
 
 Lantern slide

1917 comedy-drama films
1917 films
American black-and-white films
1910s English-language films
American silent feature films
Films about activists
Films directed by Edward Dillon
Triangle Film Corporation films
1910s American films
Silent American comedy-drama films